Captured Live! is a 1976 album by Johnny Winter. The performances were recorded in 1975 at three California venues: Swing Auditorium, San Diego Sports Arena and Oakland Coliseum.

Critical reception

In a review for AllMusic, William Ruhlmann gave the album three and a half out of five stars. He notes that Winter only wrote one of the songs and added:

Track listing 
Songwriters and track running times are taken from the original Blue Sky Records LP. Other releases may have different listings.

Side 1
 "Bony Moronie" (Larry Williams)6:50
 "Roll With Me" (Rick Derringer)4:46
 "Rock and Roll People" (John Lennon)5:39
 "It's All Over Now" (Bobby Womack, Shirley Jean Womack)6:15
Side 2
 "Highway 61 Revisited" (Bob Dylan)10:38
 "Sweet Papa John" (Johnny Winter)12:37

Personnel 
Musicians
 Johnny Winterguitar, slide guitar, vocals
 Randy Jo Hobbsbass guitar, background vocals
 Richard Hughesdrums
 Floyd Radfordguitar

References

Johnny Winter albums
1976 live albums
Albums produced by Johnny Winter
Albums with cover art by Mick Rock
Blue Sky Records live albums
Live blues rock albums